Grace Ho (1907 – 24 June 1996) was the mother of Bruce Lee. She and her husband Lee Hoi-chuen were the parents of Bruce as well as Peter Lee, Robert Lee, Phoebe Lee, and Agnes Lee.

Biography 
Grace Ho was born in 1907 in Shanghai to Cheung King-sin (張瓊仙), a European woman who was Ho Kom-tong's (何甘棠) mistress in Shanghai. Ho Kom-tong was a prominent businessman who had 12 wives and reportedly more than 30 children. Ho Kom-tong was also the younger maternal half-brother of Hong Kong businessman and philanthropist Robert Hotung. Ho eventually adopted Grace.

The ethnicity of Grace's mother also remains somewhat uncertain. For many years, it was believed that Grace's mother was of German-Catholic descent. A 2016 investigation by Charles Russo of Vice Media, based on documents that were used for the family’s immigration and genealogical evidence, showed that Grace was actually of English descent on her mother's side.

Grace spent part of her childhood in Hong Kong, living at the Ho Tung Gardens in the Peak under the care of Clara Ho Tung, her aunt. Grace later fell in love with her husband-to-be Lee Hoi-chuen (李海泉) from her admiration of his stage art. Grace traveled with Lee in San Francisco on his one-year US tour with the Mandarin Theatre in 1939. Grace reported to the US government in 1939 that her mother was English; when Grace returned to Hong Kong during the Japanese occupation of Hong Kong, she reported that her mother was German because Germany was an ally of Japan at that time. During this tour, Grace gave birth to her fourth child Bruce Lee; Lee Hoi-chuen was performing in New York City at the time of Bruce's birth. Grace's family would all return to Hong Kong in the spring of 1941 only to be stuck there during the Japanese occupation from 1941 to 1945.

Grace's three sons would go on to be very successful. Peter Lee, Grace's oldest son, excelled in fencing and meteorology, becoming assistant director of the Hong Kong Observatory. Bruce Lee would become famous in Hollywood and Hong Kong for his films and skill in martial arts, and Robert Lee would become a popular Hong Kong and Macau musician founding the band called the Thunderbirds.

Depictions in media 
Unlike most of her children, Grace was hardly ever seen in the media or on television. Her only appearance on television was with her son Robert in an interview on Good Night America with Geraldo Rivera, shortly after Bruce's death.

References

External links 
 The secrets of Bruce Lee’s heritage are in ....San Bruno?
 "Geraldo Rivera Interview Bruce Lee's Mother and Brother". YouTube.

1907 births
1996 deaths
Chinese emigrants to the United States
Family of Bruce Lee
Hong Kong people of English descent